
The following lists events that happened during 1823 in South Africa.

Events
 British trader Henry Francis Fynn established a permanent settlement at Rio De Natal after land was granted to him by the Zulu king Shaka.
 The Tswana areas are disrupted by Difaqane raids.
 Battle of Dithakong - MaNthatisi repulsed by Tlhaping with help from Griquas.
 Approximately 146 Irish settlers are brought to the Cape Colony by John Ingram.

Births
 Lewis Broadbent, a Methodist missionary in India and son of the Methodist missionary Samuel Broadbent is born at Leeudoringstad, 16 km from Wolmaransstad

References
See Years in South Africa for list of References

 
South Africa
Years in South Africa